A number of ships of the Spanish Navy have borne the name Princesa:
 , a 70-gun third-rate ship of the line, captured by the Royal Navy during the Battle of Cape St. Vincent in 1780 and taken into service as HMS Princessa.
 , a Spanish frigate or corvette.

Spanish Navy ship names